Hoseynabad Ladi (also Romanized as Ḩoseynābād Ladī) is a village in Dalgan Rural District, in the Central District of Dalgan County, Sistan and Baluchestan Province, Iran. At the 2006 census, its population was 60, in 16 families.

References 

Populated places in Dalgan County